An Odd Evening in April (Spanish: Loco cielo de Abril) is a 2014 Peruvian romantic comedy film written and directed by Sandro Ventura. It was released on April 3, 2014.

Synopsis 
It is the story of Abril, a mysterious woman with a unique vision of life who crosses paths with Bruno, a young Chilean living in Peru who is going through an existential crisis. April's philosophy shocks Bruno. One fine day, he decides to leave everything, including his job and his girlfriend. Suddenly, Bruno tries to follow April's life, without suspecting the real reasons why she lives with her back to the world.

Cast 

 Fiorella Rodríguez as April.
 Ariel Levy as Bruno.
 Adolfo Aguilar as Renato.
 Daniela Sarfati as Luna.
 Rodrigo Sánchez Patiño as Omar.
 Valeria Bringas as Carla.
 Ximena Diaz as Viviana.
 Alessa Novelli as Mayra.
 Macla Yamada as Lucia.
 Ethel Pozo as Daniela.
 Marina Bassi as Alice.
 Yaco Eskenazi

References

External links 

 

2014 films
2014 comedy films
2014 romance films
2014 romantic comedy films
Peruvian romantic comedy films
Big Bang Films films
2010s Peruvian films
2010s Spanish-language films
Films set in Peru
Films shot in Peru